The Bedford Reader is a college composition textbook published by the Bedford/St. Martin's publishing company. It is edited by X. J. Kennedy, Dorothy M. Kennedy, and Jane E. Aaron.  It is widely used in freshman composition courses at colleges across the United States.

The eleventh edition of the book is composed of over seventy essays, one short story, and one poem. It is divided into eleven sections by the various methods of development: narration, description, example, comparison and contrast, analysis, process analysis, classification, cause and effect, definition, argument and persuasion, along with a section on mixing the methods.

Famous works and authors
Numerous essays and stories by noted authors are included in The Bedford Reader. These include:

 An excerpt from Maya Angelou's I Know why the Caged Bird Sings
 "The Lottery" by Shirley Jackson
 "Shooting Dad", the essay that made Sarah Vowell famous
 An essay by Dave Barry
 "Remembering my Childhood on the Continent of Africa", from David Sedaris' Me Talk Pretty One Day
 Jessica Mitford's "Behind the Formaldehyde Curtain"
 David Foster Wallace's commencement speech for Kenyon College, "This Is Water"
 An excerpt from Michael Pollan's The Omnivore's Dilemma
 Judy Brady's "I Want a Wife"
 Gloria Naylor's "The Meanings of a Word"
 Richard Rodriguez's "Aria: A Memoir of a Bilingual Childhood"
 An excerpt from Barbara Kingsolver's Animal, Vegetable, Miracle
 John Updike's "Extreme Dinosaurs"
 Martin Luther King Jr.'s I Have a Dream speech
 Edward Said's "Clashing Civilizations?" (Said's response to Samuel P. Huntington's "The Clash of Civilizations")
 George Orwell's "Shooting an Elephant"
 Jonathan Swift's "A Modest Proposal"
 Suzanne Britt's "Neat People vs. Sloppy People"
 Brent Staples's "Black Men and Public Space"
 "Dance of the Hobs". by William Least Heat-Moon

The text quickly became a standard in college composition courses across the country.  Because of the diversity of works and authors, The Bedford Reader has become popular among Advanced Placement English teachers, specifically those teaching to the AP English Language and Composition test.

External links
Book description at Bedford-St. Martin's site

Textbooks